Mark Graham Jackson (born 30 September 1977) is an English footballer manager and former player who is head coach of Milton Keynes Dons. A former defender, he notably played for Scunthorpe United. At international level, he made four appearances for the England U20 national team.

Playing career
As a player Jackson started his career at Leeds United. He last played for reformed Farsley, after his last club Farsley Celtic was wound-up by its administrators on 12 March 2010.

Coaching career

Leeds United
On 10 November 2015, Jackson rejoined his hometown club Leeds United as the Under 15/16's Coach, rejoining his then former Leeds Academy Manager Paul Hart at the club.

On 24 June 2016, Jackson was promoted to co-Under 18's Manager at Leeds United alongside Andy Gray as part of Leeds' academy structure. Before taking the helm as the sole Manager for the 2017–18 season.

In April 2018, His Leeds Under 18's side finished the 2017–18 season Northern league in first place, thus winning the Professional Development Northern League title.

On 14 September 2020, he was promoted to Under 23's Head Coach, replacing Carlos Corberan who had left the role in the summer to take up a position as head coach at Huddersfield Town F.C.

In May 2021, his Under 23’s team won the Premier League 2 Division 2, earning promotion to Division 1, in both his first season managing this age group and the teams first season of playing in that division. The team remained unbeaten at home throughout the entire season

On 3 March 2022, Jackson was promoted to first team coach under new Leeds United Head Coach Jesse Marsch.

Milton Keynes Dons
On 23 December 2022, Jackson was appointed head coach of League One club Milton Keynes Dons. At the time of his appointment, the club were sitting in 22nd position, three points from safety. His first game in charge came three days later where his side won 1–0, a first home league win for the Dons in over four months.

Career statistics

Managerial record

References

External links

1977 births
Living people
Footballers from Leeds
Association football defenders
English footballers
Leeds United F.C. players
Huddersfield Town A.F.C. players
Barnsley F.C. players
Scunthorpe United F.C. players
Kidderminster Harriers F.C. players
Rochdale A.F.C. players
Farsley Celtic A.F.C. players
Premier League players
English Football League players
National League (English football) players
England youth international footballers
Farsley Celtic F.C. players
Northern Premier League players
English football managers
Milton Keynes Dons F.C. managers
Leeds United F.C. non-playing staff